Clonmoyle Racecourse was a racecourse in the townland of Clonmoyle West, situated  north-east of Aghabullogue village and  north-west of Coachford village.

The Ordnance Survey name book c. 1840 refers to Clonmoyle Racecourse as situated on the eastern side of Clonmoyle West townland, '60 chains north-east from Aghabologue Chapel'(). Measuring approximately one 'English mile' in circumference, it was located in a 'barren mountainous field' on the highest part of the townland, in which races took place 'three or four times' some years, and with no races taking place during other years.

The racecourse is clearly depicted on the 1841 surveyed OS Map. The Cork Placenames Archive refers to related placenames, such as 'Racecourse Crossroads' and 'Racecourse Hill'.

Today, Clonmoyle Racecourse is no longer used, with the land being employed for agricultural purposes. An annual race meeting, the Aghabullogue Point-to-point (steeplechase), takes place each January in the adjoining townland of Dromatimore.

References

External links
 acrheritage.info

Former horse racing venues in the Republic of Ireland